Stefon Lee Adams (born August 11, 1963) is a former professional American football cornerback in the  National Football League (NFL). He played six seasons for the Los Angeles Raiders (1986–1989), the Cleveland Browns (1990), and the Miami Dolphins (1990). Stefon played wide receiver for the Sacramento Surge in 1992.  He was part of the Sacramento Surge team that won World Bowl II in 1992.  He played in three games for the Hamilton Tiger-Cats in 1995, making 10 tackles and two pass deflections. Stefon has two children, Blake Adams and Ishmael Adams.

References

1963 births
Living people
American football cornerbacks
Players of American football from North Carolina
Cleveland Browns players
East Carolina Pirates football players
Los Angeles Raiders players
Miami Dolphins players
Sportspeople from High Point, North Carolina
Sacramento Surge players